The sixth season of the American reality television competition series HGTV Design Star premiered July 11, 2011. The two major additions to the show were Tanika Ray as host, and David Bromstad as mentor.

Designers

1 Age at the time of the show's filming

Contestant progress

 (WINNER) The designer won the competition.
 (RUNNER-UP) The designer received second place.
 (WIN) The designer was selected as the winner of the episode's Elimination Challenge.
 (WIN) The designer was selected as the winner of the episode's Camera Challenge.
 (HIGH) The designer was selected as one of the top entries in the Elimination Challenge, but did not win.
 (IN) The designer was not selected as either top entry or bottom entry in the Elimination Challenge, and advanced to the next challenge.
 (LOW) The designer was selected as one of the bottom entries in the Elimination Challenge, but was not deemed the worst of the designers who advanced in that particular week.
 (LOW) The designer was selected as one of the bottom entries in the Elimination Challenge, and was deemed the worst of the designers who advanced in that particular week.
 (OUT) The designer was eliminated from the competition.

Challenges

Make Over Your Living Space
The designers get into 6 teams of two and design bedrooms, a great room, and a bonus room.
First Aired: July 11, 2011
ELIMINATED: Blanche

White Box Challenge
The eleven remaining designers design white rooms.
First Aired: July 18, 2011
ELIMINATED: J

Old Room, New Life
The ten remaining designers design rooms in their first homeowner challenge.
First Aired: July 25, 2011
ELIMINATED: Doug

Bed & Breakfast
The nine remaining designers design rooms at a home.
First Aired: August 1, 2011
ELIMINATED: Bret

Dream Kitchen
The eight remaining designers design dream kitchens.
First Aired: August 8, 2011
ELIMINATED: Tyler

Wedding Reception
The seven remaining designers design a wedding reception.
First Aired: August 15, 2011
ELIMINATED: Cathy

HGTV'd
First Aired: August 22, 2011
It is Design Star meets HGTV'd as the designers help an HGTV fan and her family revitalize their home. The finalists, who will surprise the family with the ultimate multiple-room makeover, will each be responsible for a different room in the home. This week's hosting challenge requires that each finalist show how proficient they are showcasing a great on-camera reveal of their rooms to the homeowners.
GUEST JUDGE: John Gidding
ELIMINATED: Leslie, Kevin

Look For Less
The four remaining designers design rooms with a budget of $2,500
First Aired: August 29, 2011
ELIMINATED: Kellie

Tiny Houses
The three remaining designers must transform an 86 sq. ft. house into a home with a kitchen, bathroom, living area, bedroom, and dining area.
First Aired: September 5, 2011
ELIMINATED: Mark

The Next Design Star Is?
The two finalists must each redesign a room in a Harlem brownstone while shooting a pilot episode for their proposed HGTV series.
 First Aired: September 12, 2011
ELIMINATED (RUNNER-UP): Karl
 Winner: Meg Caswell

References

2011 American television seasons